Lachlan Mackenzie Copeland (born 1973) is an Australian botanist, who obtained his PhD at the University of New England, with a thesis entitled Systematic studies in Homoranthus (Myrtaceae: Chamelauciea).

Some publications

(2005). Systematic studies in Homoranthus (Myrtaceae: Chamelauciea): / b species limits, Phylogenetic relationships and generic boundaries.  532 pp. Thesis, University of New England. 

L. Jones, David & Copeland, Lachlan. (2018). "Six new species of Prasophyllum R.Br. in the Prasophyllum patens R.Br. / Prasophyllum odoratum R.S.Rogers complex from northern New South Wales." Australian Orchid Review. 83. 39-51.

Taxa published
The Australian Plant Name index indicates that he has published 18 names.

References

External links

21st-century Australian botanists
Living people
1973 births